, is a Japanese classical violist with an extensive career as soloist and chamber musician. Since 1988 she has played a 1690 Andrea Guarneri instrument.

Biography

Imai began her musical training at the age of six. She began studying at Tokyo's Toho Gakuen School of Music and switched to viola there. Then she went to the United States where she studied at the Juilliard School and Yale University. She won the Young Concert Artists International Auditions in 1967 and won highest prize at both the Geneva International Music Competition and ARD International Music Competition at Munich.

She has worked in chamber music projects with artists such as Martha Argerich, Kyung-Wha Chung, Heinz Holliger, Mischa Maisky, Midori, Murray Perahia, Gidon Kremer, Yo Yo Ma, Itzhak Perlman, András Schiff, Isaac Stern and Pinchas Zukerman, and appeared with the Berlin Philharmonic Orchestra, Royal Concertgebouw Orchestra, Vienna Symphony Orchestra, Royal Stockholm Philharmonic Orchestra, London Symphony Orchestra, the BBC Symphony Orchestra, Boston Symphony Orchestra, and Chicago Symphony Orchestra. She is a former member of the Vermeer Quartet and is the founder and a member of the Michaelangelo Quartet, where she performs together with Mihaela Martin, Daniel Austrich and Frans Helmerson. For young musicians from Japan and the Netherlands, she founded the East West Baroque Academy.

Her discography includes more than 30 releases on labels such as BIS, Chandos, DG, EMI, Hyperion, and Philips. She has been a recipient of numerous awards including the Avon Arts Award (1993), Japan's Suntory Music Award (1995) and Mainichi Award of Arts (1996). Toru Takemitsu composed for her a Viola Concerto A String Around Autumn in 1989.

Teaching 
Between 1983 and 2003 Imai taught as a professor at the Hochschule für Musik Detmold. She currently teaches at the Conservatory of Amsterdam (website of conservatory), at the Conservatoire Supérieur et Académie de Musique Tibor Varga in Sion, Switzerland, at the Conservatoire Supérieur de Musique de Genève in Geneva (website of conservatory) and at the Reina Sofía School of Music in Madrid.

Literary works
 Akogare: Viola Totomoni (憧れ ヴィオラとともに), Shunjusha (2007, 2013)

References

External links
 Nobuko Imai at Universal Classics 

Japanese classical violists
1943 births
Living people
Juilliard School alumni
Yale University alumni
Academic staff of the Reina Sofía School of Music
Toho Gakuen School of Music alumni
Place of birth missing (living people)
Academic staff of the Hochschule für Musik Detmold